Donald Revell (born 1954 in Bronx, New York) is an American poet, essayist, translator and professor.

Revell has won numerous honors and awards for his work, beginning with his first book, From the Abandoned Cities, which was a National Poetry Series winner. More recently, he won the 2004 Lenore Marshall Award and is a two-time winner of the PEN Center USA Award in poetry. He has also received the Gertrude Stein Award, two Shestack Prizes, two Pushcart Prizes and fellowships from the National Endowment for the Arts, as well as from the Ingram Merrill and Guggenheim Foundations. His most recent book is Drought-Adapted Vine (Alice James Books, 2015). He also recently published his translation of Arthur Rimbaud's A Season in Hell (Omnidawn Publishing, 2007).

Revell has taught at the Universities of Tennessee, Missouri, Iowa, Alabama, Colorado, and Utah. He currently teaches at the University of Nevada, Las Vegas. He lives in Las Vegas with his wife, poet Claudia Keelan, and their children. In addition to his writing, translating, and teaching, Revell was Editor of Denver Quarterly from 1988–94, and has been a poetry editor of Colorado Review since 1996.

Revell received his B.A. in 1975 and his M.A. in 1977 from Binghamton University, and his Ph.D. from the University at Buffalo in 1980.

Honors and awards
 2017 Nevada Writers Hall of Fame
 2008 NEA Translation Award
 2005 Silver Pen Award 
 2005 Los Angeles Times Book Prize in Poetry finalist for Pennyweight Windows
 2005 National Endowment for the Arts Fellowship
 2004 Lenore Marshall Poetry Prize for My Mojave
 2003 PEN Center USA Award for Poetry
 1992 Guggenheim Fellowship in Poetry
 1991 PEN Center USA Award for Poetry
 1988 National Endowment for the Arts Fellowship
 1985 Pushcart Prize

Published works

Poetry collections
White Campion (Alice James Books, 2021)
 The English Boat (Alice James Books, 2018)
 Drought-Adapted Vine (Alice James Books, 2015)
 Tantivy (Alice James Books, 2012)
 The Bitter Withy (Alice James Books, 2009)
 A Thief of Strings (Alice James Books, 2007)
 Pennyweight Windows: New And Selected Poems (Alice James Books, 2005)
 My Mojave (Alice James Books, 2003)
 Arcady (Wesleyan University Press, 2002)
 There Are Three (Wesleyan University Press, 1998)
 Beautiful Shirt (Wesleyan University Press, 1994)
 Erasures (Wesleyan University Press, 1992)
 New Dark Ages (Wesleyan University Press, 1990)
 The Gaza of Winter (University of Georgia Press, 1988)
 From the Abandoned Cities (Harper & Row Publishers, 1983)

Translations
 Last Verses by Jules Laforgue (Omnidawn, 2011)
 A Season in Hell by Arthur Rimbaud (Omnidawn, 2007)
 The Self-Dismembered Man: Selected Later Poems of Guillaume Apollinaire (Wesleyan University Press, 2004)
 Alcools: Poems by  Guillaume Apollinaire (Wesleyan University Press, 1995)

Essay collections
 The Art of Attention: A Poet's Eye (Graywolf Press, 2007)
 Invisible Green: Selected Prose (Omnidawn, 2005)
 Scholium  (Poetry, May 2015)

Reviews
In a retrospective review of Revell's work written by Stephanie Burt for The Nation, she comments on Pennyweight Windows: New & Selected Poems: Revell now seeks a poetry appropriate not only to loneliness but to anger and happiness, not only to freighted symbols but to facts, not only to doubt but to faith. What's more, he seems to have found what he seeks.

In Time magazine, Lev Grossman wrote about Pennywight Windows: it takes guts to write more poems about peace, war, God and children, but Revell's are so fresh, it's as if he's the first person ever to do it. He makes you feel how painfully near grace and redemption are at all times, and yet how unattainable.

There is a theme here and in other reviews of Revell's recent books. Stephanie Burt opens her review with a comment about how much Revell's work has changed in twenty years, noting the stylistic evolution, and the  increasingly spiritual focus of Revell's work, which Grossman observes in his, and which Revell corroborates in an interview by Poets & Writers: "What's next for me? I am concerned with the governance of heaven, which is mostly silence. Living in Utah and Nevada, I take my current instruction from snow and sand. They are heavenly forms-substantial and effortless. May poems be so."

References

External links
 Alice James Books Website
 American Poetry Review > Donald Revell: An Interview
 Poetry Foundation > Death, by Donald Revell
 Video: Donald Revell Reading for Omnidawn 
 Boston Review > Donald Revell Responds to Bloom 
 American Poetry Review' > Excerpt from Invisible Green''

Living people
1954 births
American male poets
Poets from New York (state)
People from the Bronx
Poets from Nevada
People from the Las Vegas Valley
University of Utah faculty
University of Nevada, Las Vegas faculty
University of Missouri faculty
Iowa Writers' Workshop faculty
American essayists
American translators
National Endowment for the Arts Fellows
American academics of English literature
American male essayists
Binghamton University alumni
Journalists from New York City